Barrio Patronato (Patronato Neighborhood) is a traditional neighborhood in Recoleta, Santiago, Chile. It is bounded by Avenida Recoleta from the west, Bellavista Street from the south, Loreto Street from the east, and Dominica street from the north.

There is Patronato metro station of Santiago Metro.

History

The neighborhood was turned into a commercial district with the arrival of Middle Eastern (Arab, Palestinian, Syrian, Lebanese) immigrants since late 19th century. In early 20th century there was a massive influx of Christian Palestinians and Lebanese fleeing the Ottoman Empire due to religious persecution, and later the economic situation and the outbreak of World War I. They were followed by Koreans, Chinese, Taiwanese, Peruvians, and people of other cultures.

Attractions

The neighborhood is known as a shopping area for affordable, trendy clothes. It is also home to the Vega Central, or main marketplace for fresh fruits and vegetables. It is possible to find Arabic restaurants. It is also possible to find restaurants serving South Korean and Vietnamese cuisine.

The neighborhood is also home to the historic church, Parroquia de Santa Filomena.

References

Neighbourhoods in Chile
Geography of Santiago, Chile